Vrhole pri Laporju is a settlement in the Municipality of Slovenska Bistrica in northeastern Slovenia. It lies in the hills northeast of Poljčane. The area is part of the traditional region of Styria. It is now included with the rest of the municipality in the Drava Statistical Region.

Name
The name of the settlement was changed from Vrhole to Vrhole pri Laporju in 1953.

References

External links
Vrhole pri Laporju at Geopedia

Populated places in the Municipality of Slovenska Bistrica